The 1990 Gael Linn Cup, the most important representative competition for elite level participants in the women's team field sport of camogie, was won by Munster, who defeated Ulster in the final, played at Ballyholland.

Arrangements
Patricia O'Grady from Clare was the star of the competition, scoring a last minute to defeat eight-in-a-row seeking Leinster, who were without Angela Downey, at Farranlea Road. She then scored 9–1 in Ulster's 10–10 to 1–2 victory in the final at Ballyholland.
Munster's Paula Carey, Jean Paula Kent and Mary Lenihan scored the goals for Munster as they defeated Leinster by 5–12 to 3–6 in the Gael Linn trophy semi-final at Farranlea Road. Ulster defeated Munster 5–11 to 5–3 in the final at Ballyholland.

Final stages

|}

Junior Final

|}

References

External links
 Camogie Association

1990 in camogie
1990
Cam